Subverted support is a logical fallacy of explanation which attempts to explain something that does not happen.

Logical Form
X happens because of Y (when X does not actually happen or exist)

Exception
The fallacy is true if a preceding statement claims that whatever follows is true.

References

Formal fallacies